Ra'ed Abdel-Rahman Fraeh Al-Nawateer is a Jordanian footballer.

International goals
Scores and results list Jordan's goal tally first.

References

External links
 
 
 

1988 births
Living people
Association football midfielders
Jordanian footballers
Jordan international footballers
2011 AFC Asian Cup players
Al-Faisaly SC players
Al-Jazeera (Jordan) players
Shabab Al-Ordon Club players
Al-Ahli SC (Amman) players
Al-Hussein SC (Irbid) players